Chiesa di San Francesco is a church in Orvieto, Umbria, Italy. It was consecrated in 1266. It belongs to the Roman Catholic Diocese of Orvieto-Todi.

History
The Franciscans established a hermitage near Orvieto in the early 13th century and built the present church in 1234. It was consecrated as SS Francesco e Ambrogio in memory of Ambrose of Massa who had died in 1240. After being enlarged in 1264, the church was consecrated simply to San Francesco in 1266 by Pope Clement IV. Until the duomo was completed in 1290, it was the largest church in Orvieto.

Architecture

The building is typical of Franciscan churches of the period with a single nave, a quadrangular apse and a trussed wooden roof. A more open look is achieved by arches which progressively project inwards. The interior was altered in the second half of the 16th century when altars were placed along the lateral walls. From 1768 to 1773, two sets of side chapels were added while the church was given a sober Baroque appearance. The dome over the transept was also added in 1773. The original facade has been heavily restored. Its rose window has been replaced but the sculpted marble portal survives intact.

Interior and furnishings
The interior originally took the form of a hall church but was redesigned in 1773 when colonnades were added to provide for side chapels. The damaged statues of Pope Boniface VIII in the left aisle date from 1297. The wooden crucifix above the altar is thought to be the work of Lorenzo Maitani (c. 1320). The three 16th-century altarpieces in the chapels are attributed to Cesare Nebbia. They depict the Immaculate Conception (1584), the Madonna and Child, and Christ in Judgment. In the chapel to the left of the presbytery, a series of frescos was discovered during restoration work in 1999. Attributed to Pietro di Puccio, they depict scenes from the life of St Matthew.

References

External links
Illustrated guide to San Francesco Church from "Key to Umbria"

Roman Catholic churches in Orvieto
13th-century establishments in Italy
1266 establishments in Europe
13th-century Roman Catholic church buildings in Italy
Francesco Orvieto